Al-Ghubayya al-Tahta was a Palestinian Arab village in the Haifa Subdistrict, located 28 km southeast of Haifa. It was depopulated during the 1947–48 Civil War in Mandatory Palestine on April 8, 1948, under the Battle of Mishmar HaEmek.

History

Al-Ghubayya al-Tahta shared an elementary school founded by the Ottomans in 1888 with the villages of al-Ghubayya-al-Fawqa and al-Naghnaghiyya. The school was closed during the British Mandate rule.

British Mandate era
In the 1922 census of Palestine, conducted by the British Mandate authorities, Ghabba al-Tahta had a population of 79 Muslims. 
In the  1931 census, the two al-Ghubayya village were counted together, the total population was 200 Muslims, in  38 houses.

In the 1945 statistics the population was  counted with the neighbouring  Al-Ghubayya al-Fawqa and al-Naghnaghiyya, and together they had a population of 1,130 Muslims, with a total of 12,139  dunams of land  according to an official land and population survey.   Of this, 209 dunams were for plantations and irrigable land,  10,883 for cereals, while a total of 1,047 dunams were non-cultivable land.

1948 and aftermath
On 8 and 9 April 1948, the Haganah raided al-Ghubayya al-Fawqa, al-Ghubayya-al-Tahta and Khirbet Beit Ras, and proceeded to blow them up in the following days.

References

Bibliography

 

 

al-Qawuqji, F. (1972): Memoirs  of al-Qawuqji, Fauzi in Journal of Palestine Studies
"Memoirs, 1948, Part I" in 1, no. 4 (Sum. 72): 27-58., dpf-file, downloadable
"Memoirs, 1948, Part II" in 2, no. 1 (Aut. 72): 3-33., dpf-file, downloadable

External links
Welcome To al-Ghubayya al-Tahta
  al-Ghubayya al-Tahta,  Zochrot 
Survey of Western Palestine, Map 8:  IAA, Wikimedia commons 
al-Ghubayya al-Tahta from the Khalil Sakakini Cultural Center
Al-Ghubayya Al-Tahta from Dr. Moslih Kanaaneh
, by Umar Ighbariyye, 20.3.2010, Zochrot

Arab villages depopulated prior to the 1948 Arab–Israeli War
District of Haifa